Nebraska is an unincorporated community in Hyde County, North Carolina, United States. Nebraska is located in southeastern Hyde County, near the Cape Hatteras National Seashore. The community was established in 1855; while the etymology of its name is not certain, it may have been named for the Kansas-Nebraska Act.

Education
The local school is Mattamuskeet School of Hyde County Schools.

References

Unincorporated communities in Hyde County, North Carolina
Unincorporated communities in North Carolina